Bibali is a village in the municipality of Buje, in northern Istria in Croatia. In 2001 it had a population of 79.

References

Populated places in Istria County